The Boerboel is a South African breed of large dog of mastiff type, used as a family guard dog. It is large, with a short coat, strong bone structure and well-developed muscles.

It is recognised by the Kennel Union of Southern Africa, but not by the Fédération Cynologique Internationale.

Legislation 
 
In South Africa, the Animal Improvement Act (62 of 1998) defines a breed of animal indigenous to or developed in the republic to be a landrace, therefore the Boerboel is regarded as a landrace in the republic. The Act grants powers to a registered "animal breeders society", and the South African Boerboel Breeders' Society (SABBS) is a registered animal breeders society. The SABBS is the only organisation authorised under the Act to officially register Boerboels. As legally registered custodian of the Boerboel dog breed, SABBS is responsible for the standards that govern identification, recording, evaluation and improvement of the breed. The Kennel Union of South Africa still recognises those Boerboels registered on its books.

History 

The Boerboel descends from an old Colonial cross-breed of mastiffs and bulldogs used both as a guard dog on remote farms and estates and for big game hunting, and known as the Boer Dog or Boer Hunting Dog. An account from 1909 describes this cross-breed as the best dog for hunting leopards and baboons in packs; a leopard with a leg caught in a trap can be killed by a pack of them. The Standard Encyclopaedia of Southern Africa describes the Boer Mastiff as an excellent fighter; one killed a leopard in each of four single combats over a number of years, but was killed by a fifth.

Breeding of the Boerboel began in the 1950s. A breed association, the Suid-Afrikaanse Boerboel Telersvereniging or South African Boerboel Breeders Association, was established in 1983. A new association, the South African Boerboel Breeders' Society, was formed in 2012 and registered with the Department of Agriculture, Forestry and Fisheries in 2014.

Characteristics 

The Boerboel is a large dog, with a strong bone structure and well-developed muscles. The head is large, and the muzzle short.

The coat is short and sleek with dense hair coverage. The recognised colours are brindle, fawn, and brown; it may or may not have a black mask. There is one minor divergence between breed standards; the Kennel Union of South Africa does not accept black but SABBS does.

The dogs show courage when threatened; they may display aggression toward other dogs or strangers.

Health 
The Boerboel may develop hip or elbow dysplasia, vaginal hyperplasia, ectropion and entropion.
Juvenile epilepsy (with attacks brought on by metabolic changes or stress) has been observed.
A Boerboel's behaviour and comportment may change over time.

Restrictions 

Ownership of the dog is limited by law in many countries: importation to Romania was prohibited in 2002, and ownership restricted to those with a court permit; the breed was banned in Denmark in 2010; in 2011 Russia designated it an "especially dangerous breed", subject to mandatory registration and certification; Ukraine has classified it as a dangerous dog, subject to mandatory microchipping, muzzle and civil liability insurance.

It is also banned or prohibited in Bermuda, France, Mauritius, and Qatar; importation is prohibited in the Faroe Islands,  Singapore, Tunisia and the Turks and Caicos islands.

References

Further reading 

 
 

Mastiffs
Dog breeds originating in Africa
Afrikaans words and phrases